In September 2011, DC Comics relaunched their entire line of publications, dubbing the new publishing initiative as The New 52. The relaunch saw DC introduce same-day release of physical comics with digital platforms, as well as characters from the former WildStorm and Vertigo imprints being absorbed into a rebooted DC Universe. The intent was to publish 52 ongoing titles each month across the DC Universe. However, DC has also counted one-shots, miniseries and maxiseries in that number. In subsequent Septembers following the launch, DC has featured unique publishing initiatives to commemorate the relaunch. DC released a total of 93 ongoing titles across multiple "wave" releases, until June 2015, when it discontinued the "New 52" branding. To expand The New 52 universe, DC also released 22 one-shots, 17 miniseries and three maxiseries.

Ongoing series

The New 52 ongoing series are organized under seven different "families," grouping similar characters or themes within the books together. By the release of the October 2013 solicitations, DC was no longer grouping the titles by these families. They instead began releasing one larger solicit, titled "The New 52 Group". However, titles that were not participating in an event for the month, such as "Forever Evil", were still grouped together in the larger solicit by the previous family headings. In September 2014, DC co-publisher Dan DiDio spoke about classifying the titles into the families, saying, "one of the things we did, when we launched the New 52, we broke those classifications up in a way that we were able to draw attention to all the characters. So we put them in groupings so we would be able to promote and help them draw attention in groups. It was never made to be a certain amount different stuff. We always want to have different styles of product... with a lot of characters, we're careful. Things like Frankenstein and Grifter and Voodoo and things of that nature, which were really risky characters and risky chances for us to take, and we're very happy to do them. Even though they didn't work, we knew there was value in those characters... We think they brought a lot of value to the launch. They brought a lot of breadth and depth to the line of books, and a diversity to the line. We didn't want to put them out and then forget about them. It was very important to make sure that they were prominent in other series, and that's why we put them in" other series.

In May 2012, DC cancelled titles from the initial launch (which had been dubbed the "First Wave") and launched new titles, which would become "Second Wave" titles. DC continued to use the "wave" format of introducing new titles, which occasionally corresponded with titles being canceled, to "constantly refresh the line". A "Third Wave" began in September 2012, while the "Fourth Wave" saw titles launching from January 2013 to March 2013. The "Fifth Wave" of new titles took place from May 2013 to July 2013. The first phase of The New 52 concluded in March 2014, at the end of "Forever Evil", with a new phase beginning in April 2014. In June 2015, after the Convergence miniseries, DC no longer used the "New 52" name to brand their books; however the continuity continued. 25 of the titles published before Convergence continued to be published with many of the same creative teams, along with 24 new titles.

"Justice League"
These titles feature characters related to the Justice League.

"Batman"
These titles feature Batman and the "Batman Family" of characters.

"Superman"
These titles feature Superman and the "Superman Family" of characters.

{| class="wikitable sortable" style="text-align:center;border:2px solid #E55451; font-weight:normal;" width=99%
|-   
! scope="col" width="15%" align="center" style="background-color:#F99895;" | Title 
! scope="col" width="15%" align="center" style="background-color:#F99895;" | Publication dates / Issues
! scope="col" width="15%" align="center" style="background-color:#F99895;" class=unsortable | Initial creative team
! scope="col" width="30%" align="center" style="background-color:#F99895;" class=unsortable | Notes / References
|-
! scope="row" | Action Comics 
| 
| WriterGrant MorrisonPencillerRags MoralesInkerRick Bryant
| align="left" | Action Comics first story arc details Superman's rebooted history, while Superman features his present day adventures. Superman's new costume is explained as a ceremonial battle armor that pays tribute to his Kryptonian past. While originally focusing in the past around the beginning of Superman's career, the series shifted to the present starting with Issue 19.
|-
! scope="row" | Batman/Superman 
| 
| WriterGreg PakArtistJae LeeBen Oliver
| align="left" | The series focuses on the shared adventures of Batman and Superman in The New 52.
|-
! scope="row" | Superboy
| 
| WriterScott LobdellPencillerR. B. SilvaInkerRobeiro Leandro da Silva
| align="left" | Superboy's history was intended to have much of it intact with the character kidnapped by N.O.W.H.E.R.E. for reverse engineering. However, writer Scott Lobdell points out that much of the character's backstory that was tied to Superman's backstory was erased when the changes to Superman were made. The series concluded in August 2014, with a "The New 52: Futures End" one-shot releasing in September 2014.
|-
! scope="row" | Supergirl
| 
| WritersMichael GreenMike JohnsonPencillerMahmud AsrarInkersDan GreenMahmud Asrar
| align="left" | 
|-
! scope="row" | Superman
| 
| WriterGeorge PérezPencillersJesús MerinoGeorge PérezInkerJesús Merino
| align="left" | 
|-   
! scope="row" | Superman/Wonder Woman
| 
| WriterCharles SouleArtistTony DanielBatt
| align="left" | The series explores the relationship between Superman and Wonder Woman.
|-
! scope="row" | Superman Unchained
| 
| WriterScott SnyderArtistJim LeeScott WilliamsDustin Nguyen
| align="left" | Includes a back-up feature written by Scott Snyder and drawn by Dustin Nguyen. 
|-   
|}

"Green Lantern"
These titles feature the members of the Green Lantern Corps, as well as the other Lantern Corps of the emotional spectrum.

"Young Justice"
These titles feature teen-aged characters and superhero teams.

"The Edge"
These are titles with war, science fiction, western, or crime themes, and include titles and characters formerly belonging to the WildStorm imprint.

"The Dark"
These are titles with supernatural, fantasy and horror themes, including titles and characters formerly belonging to the Vertigo imprint.

Other titles
Since the launch of The New 52, DC has published a variety of limited series and one-shots taking place in The New 52 universe and published under The New 52 banner.

{| class="wikitable sortable" style="text-align:center;border:2px solid #E36C0A; font-weight:normal;" width=99% 
|-  
! scope="row" colspan="4" style="background-color:#F79646;" |

One-shots
|-
! scope="col" width="15%" align="center" style="background-color:#FABF8F;" | Title 
! scope="col" width="15%" align="center" style="background-color:#FABF8F;" class=unsortable | Creative team
! scope="col" width="30%" align="center" style="background-color:#FABF8F;" class=unsortable | Notes / References
|-
| scope="row" | Batman, Incorporated Special #1August 2013
| WritersChris BurnhamJoe KeatingeDan DidioothersArtistsChris BurnhamEthan Van SciverJason Mastersothers
| align="left" |
|-
| scope="row" | Batman: Joker's Daughter #1February 2014
| WriterMarguerite BennettArtistMeghan Hetrick
| align="left" |
|-
| scope="row" | Batman Zero Year: Director's Cut #1July 2013
| WritersScott SnyderJames Tynion IVPencillersGreg CapulloRafael Albuquerque
| align="left" |
|-
| scope="row" | Forever Evil Aftermath: Batman vs. Bane #1April 2014
| WriterPeter J. TomasiPencillerScot EatonInkerJaime Mendoza
| align="left" |
|-
| scope="row" | Forever Evil Director's Cut #1October 2013
| WriterGeoff JohnsPencillerDavid Finch
| align="left" |
|-
| scope="row" | Harley Quinn Director's Cut #0June 2014
| WriterAmanda ConnerJimmy PalmiottiothersArtistsAmanda ConnerJim LeeTony S. DanielWalter SimonsonCharlie AdlardBruce TimmAdam HughesArt BaltazarDarwyn CookeChad HardinJeremy Robertsothers
| align="left" |
|-
| scope="row" | Harley Quinn Holiday Special #1December 2014
| WriterJimmy PalmiottiAmanda ConnerArtistsDarwyn CookeJohn Timmsothers
| align="left" |
|-
| scope="row" | Harley Quinn Invades Comic-Con International: San Diego #1July 2014
| WriterJimmy PalmiottiAmanda ConnerArtistsMultiple
| align="left" |
|-
| scope="row" | Harley Quinn Valentine's Day Special #1February 2015
| WriterJimmy PalmiottiAmanda ConnerArtistJohn Timms
| align="left" |
|-
| scope="row" | Justice League: Trinity War – Director's Cut #1August 2013
| WriterGeoff JohnsPencillerIvan Reis
| align="left" |
|-
| scope="row" | New Gods: Godhead #1October 2014
| WritersRobert VendittiCharles SouleCullen BunnVan JensenJustin JordanArtistsPete WoodsRags MoralesBilly Tan
| align="left" | The first chapter in the "Green Lantern" title's crossover storyline, "Godhead".
|-
| scope="row" | Robin Rises: Omega #1July 2014
| WriterPeter J. TomasiArtistsAndy KubertJonathan Glapion
| align="left" |Concluding the "Hunt for Robin" story line in Batman and... #29–32 and leading directly into Batman and Robin #33.
|-
| scope="row" | Robin Rises: Alpha #1December 2014
| WriterPeter J. TomasiArtistsAndy KubertJonathan Glapion
| align="left" |
|-
| scope="row" | Superman by Geoff Johns and John Romita, Jr.: Director's Cut #1September 2014
| WriterGeoff JohnsPencillerJohn Romita, Jr.
| align="left" |
|-
| scope="row" | Superman: Doomed #1May 2014
| WritersScott LobdellGreg PakCharles SouleArtistKen Lashley
| align="left" |
|-
| scope="row" | Superman: Doomed #2September 2014
| WritersGreg PakCharles SouleArtistsKen LashleyJack Herbert
| align="left" |
|-
| scope="row" | Superman: Lois Lane #1February 2014
| WriterMarguerite BennettArtistEmanuela Lupacchino
| align="left" |
|-
| scope="row" | Superman Unchained: Director's Cut #1July 2013
| WriterScott SnyderPencillersJim LeeDustin Nguyen
| align="left" |
|-
| scope="row" | Suicide Squad: Amanda Waller #1March 2014
| WriterJim ZubArtistAndre Coelho
| align="left" |
|-
| scope="row" | The Multiversity: Pax Americana: Director's Cut #1May 2015
| WriterGrant MorrisonArtistFrank Quietly
| align="left" | 
|-
| scope="row" | The New 52! Free Comic Book Day Special Edition #1May 2012
| WriterGeoff JohnsArtistsJim LeeIvan ReisJoe PradoKenneth RocafortGene Ha
| align="left" | A Free Comic Book Day one-shot, acting as a preview for the "Trinity War" event.
|-
| scope="row" | Young Romance: A New 52 Valentine's Day Special #1February 2013
| WritersAndy DiggleAnn NocentiCecil CastellucciPeter MilliganArtistsGene HaEmanuella LuppichinnoPhil JimenezSanford Green
| align="left" | A Valentine's Day special featuring various characters and story in anthology style.
|-
|}

{| class="wikitable sortable" style="text-align:center;border:2px solid #E36C0A; font-weight:normal;" width=99% 
|-  
! scope="row" colspan="4" style="background-color:#F79646;" |

Miniseries
|-     
! scope="col" width="15%" align="center" style="background-color:#FABF8F;" | Title 
! scope="col" width="15%" align="center" style="background-color:#FABF8F;" class=unsortable | Creative team
! scope="col" width="30%" align="center" style="background-color:#FABF8F;" class=unsortable | Notes / References
|-
| scope="row" | Damian: Son of Batman #1–4October 2013 – January 2014
| Andy Kubert
| align="left" |
|-
| scope="row" | Convergence #0–8April 2015 – May 2015
| WriterJeff KingArtistsCarlo PagulayanJason PazStephen Segovia
| align="left" | Spins out of the final issues of The New 52: Futures End and Earth 2: World's End. The story will be told over a 9 week miniseries, beginning with a zero issue, with 40 two-part miniseries tie-ins from various writers and artists that examine the worlds of the DC Universe over the decades, as well as the heroes and villains contained within. Writer Jeff King handles the scripting and storytelling for the main miniseries, with Scott Lobdell helping with the overall plot. Some of the tie-ins see the brief return of pre-New 52 Universe characters.
|-
| scope="row" | Forever Evil #1–7September 2013 – May 2014
| WriterGeoff JohnsArtistDavid Finch
| align="left" |
|-
| scope="row" | Forever Evil: A.R.G.U.S. #1–6October 2013 – March 2014
| WriterSterling GatesPencillersPhilip TanNeil EdwardsJavier PenaInkersJason PazJay LeistenJavier Pena
| align="left" |
|-
| scope="row" | Forever Evil: Arkham War #1–6October 2013 – March 2014
| WriterPeter J. TomasiPencillerScot EatonInkerJaime Mendoza
| align="left" |
|-
| scope="row" | Forever Evil: Rogues Rebellion #1–6October 2013 – March 2014
| WriterBrian BuccellatoArtistsPatrick ZircherScott Hepburn
| align="left" |
|-
| scope="row" | Human Bomb #1–4December 2012 – March 2013
| WritersJustin GrayJimmy PalmiottiArtistJerry Ordway
| align="left" |
|-
| scope="row" | Huntress #1–6October 2011 – March 2012
| WriterPaul LevitzArtistsMarcus ToJohn Dell
| align="left" |
|-
| scope="row" | Legion: Secret Origin #1–6October 2011 – March 2012
| WriterPaul LevitzArtistsChris BatistaMarc Deering
| align="left" |
|-
| scope="row" | My Greatest Adventure #1–6October 2011 – March 2012
| WritersAaron LoprestiKevin MaguireMatt KindtArtistsAaron LoprestiKevin MaguireMatt RyanScott Kolins
| align="left" |
|-
| scope="row" | National ComicsJuly 2012 – October 2012
| Various
| align="left" | A revival of the anthology title from the 1940s. It is intended to expand The New 52 universe by presenting single-issue stories about various DC characters, each by a different creative team. The titles include:Eternity #1 by Jeff Lemire and drawn by Cully HamnerLooker #1 by Ian Edginton and drawn by Mike S. Miller and Guillem MarchRose & Thorn #1 by Tom Taylor and drawn by Neil Googe and Ryan SookMadame X #1 by Rob Williams and drawn by Trevor Hairsine and Fiona Staples
|-
| scope="row" | Night Force #1–7March 2012 – September 2012
| WriterMarv WolfmanArtistTom Mandrake
| align="left" |
|-
| scope="row" | Penguin: Pain and Prejudice #1–5October 2011 – February 2012
| WriterGregg HurwitzArtistSzymon Kudranski
| align="left" |
|-
| scope="row" | Phantom Lady and Doll Man #1–4August 2012 – November 2012
| WritersJustin GrayJimmy PalmiottiArtistsCat StaggsRich Perotta
| align="left" |
|-
| scope="row" | The Ray #1–4December 2011 – March 2012
| WritersJimmy PalmiottiJustin GrayArtistJamal Igle
| align="left" |
|-
| scope="row" | The MultiversityAugust 2014 – April 2015
| WriterGrant MorrisonArtistsIvan ReisJoe PradoChris SprouseKarl StoryBen OliverFrank QuitelyCameron Stewartothers
| align="left" | The Multiversity features seven complete adventures, each set in a different parallel universe, a two part framing story, and comprehensive guidebook to the 52 alternate Earths of the DC Multiverse.
|-
| scope="row" | The Shade #1–12October 2011 – September 2012
| WriterJames RobinsonArtistCully Hamner
| align="left" |
|-
|}

{| class="wikitable sortable" style="text-align:center;border:2px solid #E36C0A; font-weight:normal;" width=99% 
|-  
! scope="row" colspan="4" style="background-color:#F79646;" |

Convergence titles
|-
! scope="row" colspan="4" style="background-color:#F79646;" | Released in April and May 2015. Titles were released as Convergence: [Title]. For example, The Atom issues was released as Convergence: The Atom.

|-     
! scope="col" width="15%" align="center" style="background-color:#FABF8F;" | Title 
! scope="col" width="15%" align="center" style="background-color:#FABF8F;" class=unsortable | Creative team
! scope="col" width="30%" align="center" style="background-color:#FABF8F;" class=unsortable | Notes / References
|-
| scope="row" | Action Comics #1–2| WriterJustin GrayArtistClaude St-Aubin
| align="left" | Set in a Crisis on Infinite Earths DC universe.
|-
| scope="row" | The Adventures of Superman #1–2| WriterMarv WolfmanArtistsRoberto ViacavaAndy Owens
| align="left" | Set in a Crisis on Infinite Earths DC universe.
|-
| scope="row" | Aquaman #1–2| WriterTony BedardArtistCliff Richards
| align="left" | Set in a "Zero Hour" DC universe.
|-
| scope="row" | Batgirl #1–2| WriterAlisa KwitneyArtistsRick LeonardiMark Pennington
| align="left" | Set in a pre-"Flashpoint" DC universe.
|-
| scope="row" | Batman: Shadow of the Bat #1–2| WriterLarry HamaArtistsPhilip TanJason Paz
| align="left" | Set in a "Zero Hour" DC universe.
|-
| scope="row" | Batman and Robin #1–2| WriterRon MarzArtistsDenys CowanKlaus Janson
| align="left" | Set in a pre-"Flashpoint" DC universe.
|-
| scope="row" | Batman and the Outsiders #1–2| WriterMarc AndreykoArtistCarlos D’anda
| align="left" | Set in a Crisis on Infinite Earths DC universe.
|-
| scope="row" | Blue Beetle #1–2| WriterScott LobdellArtistYishan Li
| align="left" | Set in a Crisis on Infinite Earths DC universe.
|-
| scope="row" | Booster Gold #1–2| WriterDan JurgensArtistsAlvaro MartinezRaul Fernandez
| align="left" | Set in a Crisis on Infinite Earths DC universe.
|-
| scope="row" | Catwoman #1–2| WriterJustin GrayArtistRon Randall
| align="left" | Set in a "Zero Hour" DC universe.
|-
| scope="row" | Crime Syndicate #1–2| WriterBrian BuccellatoArtistPhil Winslade
| align="left" | Set in a Crisis on Infinite Earths DC universe.
|-
| scope="row" | Detective Comics #1–2| WriterLen WeinArtistsDenys CowanBill Sienkiewicz
| align="left" | Set in a Crisis on Infinite Earths DC universe.
|-
| scope="row" | Green Arrow #1–2| WriterChristy MarxArtistsRags MoralesClaude St-Aubin
| align="left" | Set in a "Zero Hour" DC universe.
|-
| scope="row" | Green Lantern/Parallax #1–2| WriterTony BedardArtistsRon Wagner<br/ >Bill Reinhold
| align="left" | Set in a "Zero Hour" DC universe.
|-
| scope="row" | Green Lantern Corps #1–2| WriterDavid GallaherArtistsSteve EllisAnde Parks
| align="left" | Set in a Crisis on Infinite Earths DC universe.
|-
| scope="row" | Harley Quinn #1–2| WriterSteve PughArtistsPhil WinsladeJohn Dell
| align="left" | Set in a pre-"Flashpoint" DC universe.
|-
| scope="row" | Hawkman #1–2| WriterJeff ParkerArtistsTim TrumanEnrique Alcatena
| align="left" | Set in a Crisis on Infinite Earths DC universe.
|-
| scope="row" | Infinity, Inc. #1–2| WriterJerry OrdwayArtistBen Caldwell
| align="left" | Set in a Crisis on Infinite Earths DC universe.
|-
| scope="row" | Justice League #1–2| WriterFrank TieriArtistVicente Cifuentes
| align="left" | Set in a pre-"Flashpoint" DC universe.
|-
| scope="row" | Justice League International #1–2| WriterRon MarzArtistMike Manley
| align="left" | Set in a "Zero Hour" DC universe.
|-
| scope="row" | Justice League America #1–2| WriterFabian NiciezaArtistChriscross
| align="left" | Set in a Crisis on Infinite Earths DC universe.
|-
| scope="row" | Justice Society of America #1–2| WriterDan AbnettArtistsTom DerenickTrevor Scott
| align="left" | Set in a Crisis on Infinite Earths DC universe.
|-
| scope="row" | New Teen Titans #1–2| WriterMarv WolfmanArtistsNicola ScottMarc Deering
| align="left" | Set in a Crisis on Infinite Earths DC universe.
|-
| scope="row" | Nightwing/Oracle #1–2| WriterGail SimoneArtistsJan DuursemaDan Parsons
| align="left" | Set in a pre-"Flashpoint" DC universe.
|-
| scope="row" | Plastic Man and the Freedom Fighters #1–2| WriterSimon OliverArtistJohn McCrea
| align="left" | Set in a Crisis on Infinite Earths DC universe.
|-
| scope="row" | The Question #1–2| WriterGreg RuckaArtistCully Hamner
| align="left" | Set in a pre-"Flashpoint" DC universe.
|-
| scope="row" | Shazam! #1–2| WriterJeff ParkerArtistEvan "Doc" Shaner
| align="left" | Set in a Crisis on Infinite Earths DC universe.
|-
| scope="row" | Speed Force #1–2| WriterTony BedardArtistsTom GrummettSean Parsons
| align="left" | Set in a pre-"Flashpoint" DC universe.
|-
| scope="row" | Suicide Squad #1–2| WriterFrank TieriArtistTom Mandrake
| align="left" | Set in a "Zero Hour" DC universe.
|-
| scope="row" | Superboy #1–2| WriterFabian NiciezaArtistsKarl MolineJose Marzan Jr
| align="left" | Set in a "Zero Hour" DC universe.
|-
| scope="row" | Superboy and the Legion of Super-Heroes #1–2| WriterStuart MooreArtistsGus StormsMark Farmer
| align="left" | Set in a Crisis on Infinite Earths DC universe.
|-
| scope="row" | Supergirl: Matrix #1–2| WriterKeith GiffenArtistTimothy Green II
| align="left" | Set in a "Zero Hour" DC universe.
|-
| scope="row" | Superman #1–2| WriterDan JurgensArtistsLee WeeksDan Jurgens
| align="left" | Set in a pre-"Flashpoint" DC universe.
|-
| scope="row" | Superman: The Man of Steel #1–2| WriterLouise SimonsonArtistsJune BrigmanRoy Richardson
| align="left" | Set in a "Zero Hour" DC universe.
|-
| scope="row" | Swamp Thing #1–2| WriterLen WeinArtistKelley Jones
| align="left" | Set in a Crisis on Infinite Earths DC universe.
|-
| scope="row" | The Atom #1–2| WriterTom PeyerArtistsSteve YeowellAndy Owens
| align="left" | Set in a pre-"Flashpoint" DC universe.
|-
| scope="row" | The Flash #1–2| WriterDan AbnettArtistFederico Dallocchio
| align="left" | Set in a Crisis on Infinite Earths DC universe.
|-
| scope="row" | Titans #1–2| WriterFabian NiciezaArtistsRon WagnerJose Marzan
| align="left" | Set in a pre-"Flashpoint" DC universe.
|-
| scope="row" | Wonder Woman #1–2| WriterLarry HamaArtistJosh Middleton
| align="left" | Set in a Crisis on Infinite Earths DC universe.
|-
| scope="row" | World's Finest Comics'' #1–2| WriterPaul LevitzArtistsJim FernJoe RubinsteinShannon Wheeler 
| align="left" | Set in a Crisis on Infinite Earths DC universe.
|}

References
Notes
1. For additional creative team information, see each title's individual article.
2. Issues 19–32 saw the series retitled to Batman and..., before returning to its original title of Batman and Robin with issue 33. The retitled issues are: #19: Batman and Red Robin; #20: Batman and Red Hood; #21: Batman and Batgirl; #22: Batman and Catwoman; #23: Batman and Nightwing; #24–28: Batman and Two-Face; #29: Batman and Aquaman; #30: Batman and Wonder Woman; #31: Batman and Frankenstein; #32: Batman and Ra's al Ghul. Issue 25 was originally solicited as Batman and Carrie Kelley.
3. Creative team for initial month of publication. For additional creative team information, see title's individual article.
4. The issue published for this title in its "ending" month was the last to use the "New 52" branding. The title continued to be published with the same numbering in June 2015 after Convergence.References'''

External links

 DC Comics comic page

Lists of comics by DC Comics